The Bolshoy Chabes is a river in Perm Krai and Komi Republic, Russia, a right tributary of Veslyana which in turn is a tributary of Kama.

References

Rivers of Perm Krai
Rivers of the Komi Republic